ČSA may refer to:
 Czech Airlines of the Czech Republic, formerly Československé Státní Aerolinie of  Czechoslovakia
 Czech Society of Actuaries